Judge Martinez may refer to:

Jose E. Martinez (born 1941), judge of the United States District Court for the Southern District of Florida
Philip Ray Martinez (1957–2021), judge of the United States District Court for the Western District of Texas
Ricardo S. Martinez (born 1951), judge of the United States District Court for the Western District of Washington
William J. Martínez (born 1954), judge of the United States District Court for the District of Colorado

See also
Justice Martinez (disambiguation)